The People's Republic of China competed at the 2015 World Aquatics Championships in Kazan, Russia from 24 July to 9 August 2015.

Medalists

Diving

Chinese divers are eligible for two spots in each individual event (1 m, 3 m, and 10 m) and one team spot for each synchronized event (3 m, 10 m, and team).

Men

Women

Mixed

Open water swimming

China has fielded a team of thirteen swimmers to compete in the open water marathon. Among the official roster featured 2012 Olympian Fang Yanqiao.

Men

Women

Mixed

Swimming

Chinese swimmers have achieved qualifying standards in the following events (up to a maximum of 2 swimmers in each event at the A-standard entry time, and 1 at the B-standard): Swimmers must qualify at the 2015 Chinese Swimming Championships (for pool events) to confirm their places for the Worlds.

The Chinese team consists of 51 swimmers (25 men and 26 women). Nineteen of these swimmers have competed at the previous World Championships in Barcelona including undisputed superstars and Olympic champions Sun Yang in the long-distance freestyle and Ye Shiwen in the individual medley.

Men

Women

Mixed

Synchronized swimming

China has fielded a full squad of synchronized swimmers to compete in each of the following events at the World Championships.

Water polo

Men's tournament

Team roster

Wu Honghui
Tan Feihu
Hu Zhangxin
Dong Tao
Lu Wenhui
Li Li
Chen Zhongxian
Li Lun
Xie Zekai
Chen Jinghao
Zhang Chufeng
Liang Nianxiang
Liang Zhiwei

Group play

13th–16th place semifinals

15th place game

Women's tournament

Team roster

Yang Jun
Tian Jianing
Mei Xiaohan
Xiong Dunhan
Niu Guannan
Sun Yating
Song Donglun
Zhang Cong
Zhao Zihan
Zhang Weiwei
Wang Xinyan
Zhang Jing
Peng Lin

Group play

Playoffs

Quarterfinals

5th–8th place semifinals

Fifth place game

References

External links
CSA Official Site

Nations at the 2015 World Aquatics Championships
2015 in Chinese sport
China at the World Aquatics Championships